Berlin, Michigan may refer to 

Marne, Michigan, originally Berlin, in Ottawa County
Berlin Township, Ionia County, Michigan
Berlin Center, Michigan, within that township
Berlin Township, St. Clair County, Michigan
Berlin Charter Township, Michigan, in Monroe County